Norman Douglas Hutchinson (1932–2010) was a British Royal painter, noted for his 1988 painting of Queen Elizabeth II.

History 
Hutchinson was born in Calcutta, India on Oct. 11, 1932. He was the illegitimate child of Hon. Eric Douglas – a Scottish nobleman - and his 15-year-old Anglo-Indian servant Florence. However, despite (or perhaps because of) his noble parentage, he was given to an orphanage, Dr. Graham's Homes in Kalimpongat the age of four months. He later discovered his parentage while going through the files at the Home. He eventually met his mother, when she was a widow living in poverty in Calcutta. He never met his father.

Lady Mountbatten, a patron of the orphanage, made note of the young Hutchinson's artistic talent. A portrait of Lady Mountbatten was commissioned, as was a portrait of the orphanage founder Dr. Graham. These early paintings sealed his artistic fate and future: both paintings still survive.

The young Hutchinson met and fell in love with Gloria Mudaliar, of Russian and Indian heritage (whose parents had owned a circus!). They married in 1955 and moved to London in 1959, with her sister and their two young children. He eventually started an engineering company which became very successful, though he continued his paintings on the side, with Gloria his most frequent subject. His portrait commissions continued to come in, albeit irregularly; it was his painting of the Queen Mother, wearing the famous Koh-i-Noor diamond from India, that brought him fame, and, to a certain extent, fortune.

The family bought two farmhouses in the south of France, with an extensive garden, which they renovated in Indian style. In 1988, they revisited India for the first time and made capital contributions toward a new dormitory at the orphanage where Hutchinson grew up. They eventually moved to Morocco.

As a painter, Hutchinson's works include portraits of Nehru, Prince Philip, Elizabeth and the Queen Mother.

Death 
Hutchinson died on the evening of 24 June 2010 at his home in Marrakech, Morocco. His wife still lives in Dar el Mudal today, and rents out rooms to visitors.

References

 Kilkelly, Colin interview with Norman Hutchinson on the Yacout Info website (16 April 2009)
 "Gloria in Excelsis" The Telegraph (Kolkata) (18 February 2005)
 "The History of Dr Graham and the Homes" on the Dr. Graham's Homes: Kalimpong, India website
 article The Times (London)

Further reading
 Halsby, Julian (ed.) A Hand to Obey the Demon's Eye: the life and work of the painter Norman Douglas Hutchinson.  London, Unicorn, 2000. 
 Hutchinson, Norman D. Gloria.  London: John Rule, 2003. 

1932 births
2010 deaths
Artists from Kolkata
20th-century British painters
British male painters
21st-century British painters
20th-century British male artists
21st-century British male artists